People distinguished in a variety of fields have graduated from the University of Minnesota Duluth.

Arts
Alison Aune - artist
Jim Brandenburg - National Geographic nature photographer
Joel McKinnon Miller - actor on the comedy series Brooklyn Nine-Nine and HBO's Big Love
Lorenzo Music - actor and voice actor; the voice of Garfield; Carlton the doorman on Rhoda
Janelle Pierzina - contestant on seasons 6, 7, and 14 of Big Brother
Kathleen Ridder - philanthropist, educator, writer, equality for women activist
Ann Royer - painter and sculptor
Manila Luzon - drag queen, comedian, recording artist, and television personality

Military
Bruce A. Carlson - former director of the National Reconnaissance Office and former four-star general in the Air Force

Politics
Tom Bakk - current Minority Leader of the Minnesota Senate
Michael S. Berman - longtime Washington lawyer and lobbyist; deputy chief of staff for Walter Mondale
Eric Eskola -  journalist and television personality well known for his coverage of Minnesota politics and government
Mike Hatch - former Minnesota Attorney General (1999–2007); 2006 candidate for Governor
John Linder - former 9 term Congressman representing Georgia's 4th, 7th, and 11th districts
Don Ness - Mayor of Duluth 2008–2016
Yvonne Prettner Solon - Lieutenant Governor of Minnesota 2011–2015
Elwyn Tinklenberg - former Minnesota Department of Transportation Commissioner; 2008 congressional candidate for Minnesota's 6th Congressional District

Science and engineering
Brian Kobilka - 2012 Nobel Prize winner in chemistry
Amit Singhal - former senior vice president at Google

Business
Bill Aho - former CEO of ClearPlay; played an instrumental role turning around Red Lobster while a Senior Vice President for Darden Restaurants
David Oreck - founder of the Oreck Corporation
Robert Senkler - Chairman and CEO of Securian Financial Group

Sports
Bob Davidson, Major League Baseball umpire since 1982 (attended, but did not graduate)
Dan Devine - head football coach with the Missouri Tigers, Green Bay Packers and Notre Dame Fighting Irish
Jay Guidinger - center with the Cleveland Cavaliers
Tod Kowalczyk - UW - Green Bay and Toledo head men's basketball coach
Ericca Kern - female bodybuilder and model
Scott LeDoux - professional boxer whose opponents include Ken Norton, George Foreman. and Larry Holmes.  
Jeff Monson - grappling and MMA fighter
Dick Pesonen - NFL player
John Shuster - Olympic curling medalist
David Viaene - NFL player with the New England Patriots and Green Bay Packers
Ted McKnight - NFL running back with the Kansas City Chiefs and Buffalo Bills

Men's hockey
Greg Andrusak - NHL player with the Pittsburgh Penguins, Toronto Maple Leafs, and San Jose Sharks
Pat Boutette - NHL player with the Toronto Maple Leafs, Hartford Whalers, and Pittsburgh Penguins
J. T. Brown (ice hockey) - NHL player with the Tampa Bay Lightning
Chad Erickson - NHL player with the New Jersey Devils
Justin Faulk - NHL player with the Carolina Hurricanes
Jesse Fibiger - NHL player with the San Jose Sharks
Rusty Fitzgerald - NHL player with the Pittsburgh Penguins
Justin Fontaine - NHL player with the Minnesota Wild
Jason Garrison -  NHL player with the Florida Panthers
Curt Giles - NHL player with the Minnesota North Stars, St. Louis Blues, and New York Rangers
John Harrington - member of 1980 U.S. Olympic hockey gold-medal team that beat the USSR in the Miracle on Ice game
Brett Hull -  NHL player with Calgary Flames, St. Louis Blues, Dallas Stars, Detroit Red Wings, and Phoenix Coyotes; 3rd all-time in the NHL with 741 goals
Alex Iafallo - NHL player with the Los Angeles Kings
Jim Johnson - NHL player with the Pittsburgh Penguins, Minnesota North Stars, Washington Capitals, and Phoenix Coyotes
Tom Kurvers - Hobey Baker Award winner in 1983; NHL player with the Montreal Canadiens, Buffalo Sabres, New Jersey Devils, Toronto Maple Leafs, Vancouver Canucks, New York Islanders, and Mighty Ducks of Anaheim
Dave Langevin- WHA player with the Edmonton Oilers; NHL player with the New York Islanders, Minnesota North Stars, and Los Angeles Kings
Junior Lessard - Hobey Baker Award winner in 2004; NHL player with the Dallas Stars, Atlanta Thrashers, and Tampa Bay Lightning
Chris Marinucci - Hobey Baker Award winner in 1994; player with the Los Angeles Kings, and New York Islanders
Bob Mason - NHL player with the Washington Capitals, Chicago Blackhawks, Quebec Nordiques, and Vancouver Canucks
Bryan McGregor - Czech Extraliga player with HC Oceláři Třinec
Rick Mrozik - NHL player with the Calgary Flames
Matt Niskanen - NHL player with the Dallas Stars and Pittsburgh Penguins
Evan Oberg - NHL player with the Vancouver Canucks and Florida Panthers
Mark Pavelich - member of 1980 U.S. Olympic hockey gold-medal team that beat the USSR in the Miracle on Ice game; played in the NHL with the New York Rangers, Minnesota North Stars, and San Jose Sharks
Mike Peluso - played in the NHL with the Chicago Blackhawks; not to be confused with Mike Peluso, who also played with the Blackhawks
Derek Plante - NHL player with Buffalo Sabres, Dallas Stars, and the Philadelphia Flyers
Shjon Podein - NHL player with the Edmonton Oilers, Philadelphia Flyers, Colorado Avalanche, St. Louis Blues; Stanley Cup winner in 2000–01 with Colorado Avalanche
Mason Raymond - NHL player with the Vancouver Canucks
Glen "Chico" Resch - NHL goalie with the Colorado Rockies, New York Islanders and New Jersey Devils
Jon Rohloff - NHL player with the Boston Bruins
Jay Rosehill - NHL player with the Toronto Maple Leafs
Alex Stalock - NHL goaltender with the Minnesota Wild and San Jose Sharks
Tim Stapleton- NHL player with the Toronto Maple Leafs, Atlanta Thrashers, and the relocated Atlanta team Winnipeg Jets
Dennis Vaske - NHL  player with the New York Islanders, Boston Bruins
Bill Watson - Hobey Baker Award winner in 1984; NHL player with the Chicago Blackhawks
Craig Weller - NHL player with the Phoenix Coyotes, and Minnesota Wild
Larry Wright - NHL player with the Philadelphia Flyers, California Golden Seals, and the Detroit Red Wings

Women's hockey
Haley Irwin
Kim Martin
Caroline Ouellette
Tuula Puputti
Maria Rooth
Jenny Schmidgall-Potter
Hanne Sikio
Saara Tuominen

References 

University of Minnesota Duluth people
List
List